Megan Anderson, may refer to:

 Megan Anderson (fighter) (born 1990), Australian MMA fighter
 Megan Anderson (netball) (born 1974), Australian netballer